Ralph Friedman (June 3, 1916 – June 3, 1995) was an American author best known for his books about Oregon.

Ralph Friedman was born and raised in Chicago.  He hitchhiked to Oregon in 1933 at the age of 16.  He wrote 10 books, and contributed to many other books, magazines, and newspapers.  For ten years, he led the travel class "Oregon for the Curious", offered by Portland Community College (PCC).  He also taught writing and folklore for PCC and for Portland State University. He died in Portland, Oregon on June 3, 1995, his 79th birthday.

Works
 The Other Side of Oregon (1992) 
 In Search of Western Oregon (1991) 
 This Side of Oregon (1982) 
 Tracking Down Oregon (1978) 
 A Touch of Oregon – Love Song to a State (1976) 
 Tales Out of Oregon (1976) 
 Oregon for the Curious (First Edition, 1965; Second Edition, 1966; Third Edition, 1972) 
 Northwest Passages: A Book of Travel (1968) ASIN B0006CY1RA
 "West's Wildest Cattle Drive" (Real West, Mar. 1965, p. 23)
  "A Bible for Snowshoe" (Real West, Jan. 1961, p. 37)
  "Legend of the Amazing Pete French" (Real West, May 1962, p. 43)
  "Murdering Scourge of Snake River" (Real West, Jan. 1963, p. 11)
  " Home on the Range" (Frontier Times, March 1963, p. 28)

External links 
Caxton Press, publisher of several of Friedman's books; books can be ordered online
Image of the cover of "West's Wildest Cattle Drive"

1916 births
American travel writers
Writers from Chicago
1995 deaths
Writers from Portland, Oregon
Portland State University faculty
20th-century American non-fiction writers
Portland Community College faculty
20th-century American male writers
American male non-fiction writers